Trechus sjoestedti is a species of ground beetle in the subfamily Trechinae. It was described by Deuve in 1926.

References

sjoestedti
Beetles described in 1926